Manerbio is a town and comune in the province of Brescia, in Lombardy, northern Italy. It received the honorary title of city with a presidential decree on May 14, 1997.

Transportation 
Manerbio has a railway station on the Brescia–Cremona line.

References

Cities and towns in Lombardy